The 1995 World Mountain Running Championships was the 11th edition of the global mountain running competition, World Mountain Running Championships, organised by the World Mountain Running Association and was held in Edinburgh, Scotland on 10 September 1995.

Results

Men
Distance 12.2 km, difference in height 820 m (climb).

Men team

Men junior

Men junior team

Women
Distance 7.85 km, difference in height 450 m (climb).

Women team

References

External links
 World Mountain Running Association official web site

World Mountain Running Championships
World Long Distance Mountain Running